The City of Darwin is a local government area of the Northern Territory, Australia. It includes the central business district of the capital, Darwin City, and represents two-thirds of its metropolitan population.

History
The first Town and District Council was formed in 1874. The Darwin Town Council was created in 1915. From 1921 the five member Council had been elected on a ratepayer's franchise. In 1930 the Mayor and Councillors resigned in protest against the re-introduction of adult suffrage. A caretaker Council was appointed until 1937, when it was abolished at the council's own request.

In 1955 a statement added to the Local Government Ordinance provided for the Constitution of the Municipality of Darwin. In 1957 the council was increased to twelve members and a Mayor.

An annual election providing for the Mayor and half of the Council members to be retired at each election, was also introduced at this time. The first council elections were held on 29 June 1957 and the first elected mayor of Darwin was Lucius (Bill) Richardson. In 1959 an Ordinance provided that the Municipality of Darwin be constituted a city and named 'City of Darwin'.

The first female Mayor of Darwin was Dr Ella Stack, who served as the Mayor of Darwin from May 1975 to November 1979, and as Darwin's first Lord Mayor from November 1979.

Wards and councillors
City of Darwin is divided into four wards, governed by 12 Councillors across those wards, as well as one directly elected Lord Mayor. Councillors from each ward are elected using a Single Transferable Vote (STV) proportional system.

Suburbs

Most of the suburb of Charles Darwin which is largely occupied by the Charles Darwin National Park reaches outside of the boundaries of the City of Darwin into unincorporated area, as do large parts of Berrimah and Hidden Valley.
The last two suburbs, Buffalo Creek and Holmes, were approved in 2007. They are still largely undeveloped, especially Buffalo Creek.

Demographics

Sister Cities
The city of Darwin has seven sister cities.

References

External links
 City of Darwin website

Darwin
Darwin, Northern Territory